The Research Institute for Development, or Institut de Recherche pour le Développement (IRD), is a French science and technology establishment under the joint supervision of the French Ministries of Higher Education and Research and Foreign Affairs. It operates internationally from its headquarters in Marseille, and two metropolitan centres of Montpellier and Bondy.

It was  created as the Office de la recherche scientifique et technique outre-mer or ORSTOM, ‘Overseas Scientific and Technical Research Office’) in 1943.

Missions 
The IRD institute has three main missions: research on world development, overseas consultancy and training.

It conducts scientific programs contributing to the sustainable development of the countries of the South, with an emphasis on the relationship between man and the environment.

Organisation 
The IRD's scientific activities are organised through five departments:
Earth and Environment
Living Resources
Societies and Health
Expertise and consulting
Support and training

Associated people 
A number of notable researchers are or have been associated with Institut de recherche pour le développement, including:
 André Briend - pediatric nutritionist
 Denis Vidal - anthropologist
 Jean Marie Bosser - botanist and agronomical engineer
 Jean-Philippe Chippaux - snakebite and tropical medicine expert
 Jean-Paul Gonzalez - virologist
 Michel Luc - nematologist

See also 
Bactris nancibaensis
Serer people
Mistrals

References
 Official website
 Videos from Canal IRD Web TV 
 IRD on-line scientific library (37,000 documents for downloading)

Government agencies of France
Research institutes in France
Organizations based in Marseille